Tin Hau (lit. "Queen of Heaven") may be:

Mazu, also called "Tin Hau" in Cantonese
Tin Hau, Hong Kong, area in Hong Kong
Tin Hau station, MTR station serving the Tin Hau area
Tin Hau (constituency), a constituency of the Wan Chai District Council

See also
Tin Hau temples in Hong Kong